Hot Spring Canyon is a drainage located in the Cleveland National Forest in the Orange, Riverside and San Diego counties of California. The mountainous region is known locally as the Santa Ana Mountains. The canyon is formed by Hot Spring Creek, a major tributary of San Juan Creek watershed. Hot Springs Creek is known for its many waterfalls and swimming holes.

The Upper part of the hot spring canyon is the most popular place to hike and consists of many native plant species and grand waterfalls. The upper hot spring hike is considered a strenuous adventure hike according to its difficulty. The lower part of the hot spring canyon is a much harder and more dangerous hike and isn't recommended for beginners due to many slippery rocks, large waterfalls and narrow crevasses. If you do manage to hike down this part you will need rope, for there will be times to rappel down many waterfalls including the largest waterfall in Orange County.

Upper canyon 
The peak season to hike this canyon is in the months December thru May (if you want there to be any water). To start this hike take the Ortega highway (hwy 74) to the main divide truck trail. That same road will eventually turn into long canyon road. Follow that road up for about 2.5 miles until the turn off left at Hot spring canyon. Many paths will take you to the trail-head but try to follow falcon trail. If you get lost, then any of the small paths around the blue jay campground will bring you there. Follow the small trail down to a gully, this may require some bush whacking.  Continue to head down the canyon and you will meet the first waterfall with little water and has two pools (one in the middle of the fall and one at the bottom). Just a bit farther down the canyon you will finally meet the main water source of the hike, which flows from the Los Pinos Peak. Only another 0.4 miles and you will reach the end of upper hot spring canyon with a 25-foot waterfall and a twelve foot deep pool (deepest in the range).

Lower canyon 
If you managed to do the upper part of the canyon without a struggle, then continue on your way from the 25 foot waterfall. To get down this fall there should be a steep path to your right (if you're facing and on top of the falls) make your way and see a gravely steep like cliff. Caution when heading down, it's a good idea to use rope, but use extreme caution if you don't. If you continue to head down the canyon, the terrain will become very treacherous and there will be many waterfalls to shimmy and climb down. Manage all of this and you will be greeted with the sight of the largest waterfall in all of the Santa Ana Mountains. Lower hot spring canyon falls is a sight to see, estimated 140 feet of water plummeting over a wall of rock. If you're brave enough to rock climb down this and make it safely down the falls keep heading down the canyon and eventually  will make it to Lazy W Ranch (but you will need two cars in order to do this). Alternate routes to the lower falls would be to start at the ranch and head up the canyon but cautions such as
Toxicodendron diversilobum and other plants may make traversing difficult.

Hiking totals and distances 
The lengths of both hikes aren't very long, but the hard bolder scrambling and rock climbing can make this hike seem longer than it really is. The estimated time for upper hot spring canyon is around two and a half hours, and is only three miles(there and back). The time for the lower canyon is 9 miles (there and back) and takes basically all day (roughly ten hours). This canyon is one of the prettiest in the Santa Ana Mountains, with the largest waterfall, the deepest swimming hole, and all wildlife the range has to offer. This canyon is also one of the most dangerous and should not be taken lightly, so use extreme caution when entering Hot Spring Canyon.

References

Santa Ana Mountains